Mayronnes is a commune in the Aude department in southern France.

Geography
The commune is located in the Corbières Massif.

The village lies in the northwestern part of the commune, on the left bank of the Madourneille brook, a tributary of the Orbieu, which forms part of the commune's southeastern border.

Population

See also
 Corbières AOC
 Communes of the Aude department

References

Communes of Aude
Aude communes articles needing translation from French Wikipedia